La Vie Théodore is a 2005 album recorded by French singer Alain Souchon. It was his eleventh studio album and was released on 2 September 2005. It achieved smash success in France where it remained for 66 weeks in the top 200, including two weeks at the top. It was also successful in Belgium (Wallonia) (#1) and hit a moderate success in Switzerland (#3). It provided two singles : "Et si en plus y'a personne" (#19 in France, #12 in Belgium) and "La Vie Théodore" (#68 in France). The album was almost entirely written by the singer himself, while the musics were composed by Laurent Voulzy and Souchon's son, Pierre Souchon, according to the songs. The album's name is a tribute to Théodore Monod.

Track listing

Source : Allmusic.

Releases

Certifications and sales

Charts

References

2005 albums
Alain Souchon albums